Liberatrix (minor planet designation: 125 Liberatrix) is a main-belt asteroid. It has a relatively reflective surface and an M-type spectrum. Liberatrix is a member of an asteroid family bearing its own name.

It was discovered by Prosper Henry on 11 September 1872, from Paris. Some sources give Paul Henry sole credit for its discovery.  The asteroid's name is a feminine version of the word "liberator". Henry may have chosen the name to mark the liberation of France from Prussia during the Franco-Prussian War in 1870. More specifically, it may honor Adolphe Thiers, the first President of the French Republic, who arranged a loan that enabled the Prussian troops to be removed from France.

In the late 1990s, a network of astronomers worldwide gathered lightcurve data to derive the spin states and shape models of 10 asteroids, including Liberatrix. Liberatrix's lightcurve has a large amplitude of 0.4 in magnitude, indicating an elongated or irregular shape.

The spectrum of this asteroid matches a M-type asteroid. It may be the remnant of an asteroid that had undergone differentiation, with orthopyroxene minerals scattered evenly across the surface. There is no indication of hydration.

To date, there have been at least two observed occultations by Liberatrix. Early on 11 December 2014, Liberatrix occulted a 9th magnitude star and will be visible over the majority of Southern California and a swath of Mexico.

References

External links 
 
 

000125
000125
000125 
000125 
Discoveries by Paul Henry and Prosper Henry
Named minor planets
000125
18720911